Olena Andriivna Stetskiv (born 15 June 1994 in Lviv, Ukraine) is a Ukrainian luger. She participated at the 2014 and 2018 Winter Olympics.

Career
Stetskiv competed at the 2012 Winter Youth Olympics in Innsbruck, Austria, where she was 9th in the singles competition and 7th in the team relay (together with Dukach, Buryy, and Lehedza). Next season she debuted in World Cup competitions.

As of February 2022, Stetskiv's best Luge World Cup finish was 12th during the 2018–19 in Altenberg, Germany.

Stetskiv competed at the 2014 Winter Olympics for Ukraine. In the women's singles, she placed 26th.

She represented Ukraine at the 2018 Winter Olympics in Pyeongchang, South Korea. She finished 28th in women's singles.

In 2022, Olena Stetskiv was nominated for her third Winter Games in Beijing.

Personal life
Stetskiv graduated from Lviv State University of Physical Culture. Her hobbies are music and football.

Career results

Winter Olympics

World Championships

European Championships

Luge World Cup

Rankings

References

External links
 

1994 births
Living people
Ukrainian female lugers
Lugers at the 2014 Winter Olympics
Lugers at the 2018 Winter Olympics
Lugers at the 2022 Winter Olympics
Olympic lugers of Ukraine
Sportspeople from Lviv
Lugers at the 2012 Winter Youth Olympics